Haymarket bus station is the main bus station serving the city of Leicester. Originally built in 1994, it lies next to and operates as a transport hub for Haymarket Shopping Centre.

History
The bus station was developed at a proposed cost of £2m in mid-1994, coinciding with a major refurbishment of the adjacent Haymarket Shopping Centre complex. from January 2015 the bus station was closed for redevelopment 
to double the size, the new bus station opened during May 2016.

Services
Haymarket bus station is open seven days a week and is used for mostly local services operated by Arriva Midlands, Centrebus, First Leicester and Roberts Coaches alongside longer distance services from Stagecoach Midlands.

Facilities
The main Leicester Shopmobility offices are located within the station at the Belgrave Gate entrance. a smaller office is located within Highcross Leicester.

The bus station also has public toilets which have been recently refurbished alongside changing places accessible facilities.

References

Bus stations in England
Transport in Leicester
Buildings and structures in Leicester